The Pink Panther Strikes Again is a 1976 comedy film. The fifth film in The Pink Panther series, its plot picks up three years after The Return of the Pink Panther, with former Chief Inspector Charles Dreyfus (Herbert Lom) about to be released from a psychiatric hospital after having finally been driven insane by new Chief Inspector Jacques Clouseau's (Peter Sellers) unrelenting ineptitude in the previous films. A typically disastrous visit from Clouseau on the day of his release prompts a swift relapse which cancels Dreyfus's scheduled discharge, but he soon escapes anyway, and organizes an elaborate criminal plot to threaten the countries of the world with annihilation by a massive laser weapon if they do not assassinate Clouseau for him.

Unused footage from the film was later included in Trail of the Pink Panther (1982), after Sellers's death.

Plot
After three years in a psychiatric hospital, former Chief Inspector of the Sûreté Charles Dreyfus (Herbert Lom), has recovered from his obsession to kill  Jacques Clouseau (Peter Sellers) and is about to be released; Clouseau, who has since replaced Dreyfus as Chief Inspector, arrives unannounced to speak on behalf of his former boss, and within minutes drives Dreyfus insane again. Dreyfus later escapes from the hospital and once again tries to kill Clouseau by planting a bomb while the Inspector (by periodic arrangement) duels with his manservant Cato (Burt Kwouk). The bomb destroys Clouseau's apartment and injures Cato, but Clouseau himself is unharmed, being lifted from the room by an inflatable hunchback disguise. Deciding that a more elaborate plan is needed to eliminate Clouseau, Dreyfus enlists an army of career criminals to his cause and kidnaps nuclear physicist Professor Hugo Fassbender (Richard Vernon) and the Professor's daughter Margo (Briony McRoberts), forcing the professor to build a "doomsday weapon" in return for their freedom.

Clouseau travels to the UK to investigate Fassbender's disappearance, where he wrecks their family home and ineptly interrogates the domestic staff, including Jarvis (Michael Robbins), Fassbender's cross-dressing butler. Although Jarvis is later killed by the kidnappers, to whom he had become a dangerous witness, Clouseau discovers a clue that leads him to the Oktoberfest in Munich, West Germany. Meanwhile, Dreyfus, using Fassbender's invention, disintegrates the United Nations headquarters in New York City and blackmails the leaders of the world, including the President of the United States and his Secretary of State, into assassinating Clouseau. However, many of the nations instruct their operatives to kill Clouseau to gain Dreyfus's favor and possibly the Doomsday Machine. As a result of their orders and Clouseau's obliviousness, all of the other assassins end up killing one another until only the agents of Egypt and the Soviet Union  remain.

The Egyptian assassin (Omar Sharif) shoots one of Dreyfus's assassins, mistaking him for Clouseau, but is seduced by the Russian operative Olga Bariosova (Lesley-Anne Down), who makes the same mistake. When the real Clouseau arrives, he is perplexed by Olga's affections but learns from her Dreyfus's location at a castle in Bavaria. Dreyfus is elated at the erroneous report of Clouseau's demise, but suffers from a painful toothache and sends for a dentist; when Clouseau hears a dentist is needed at the castle, he disguises himself as an elderly German dentist and finally gains entry to the castle (his earlier attempts at sneaking in the castle had been repeatedly foiled by his general ineptitude and the castle's drawbridge). Unrecognized by Dreyfus, Clouseau ends up intoxicating both of them with nitrous oxide. When 'the dentist' mistakenly pulls the wrong tooth, Dreyfus immediately figures out it is Clouseau in disguise. Clouseau escapes, and  a vengeful and now totally insane Dreyfus prepares to use the machine to destroy England.  Clouseau, eluding Dreyfus's henchmen, unwittingly foils Dreyfus's plans when a medieval catapult outside the castle launches him on top of the doomsday machine, causing it to malfunction and fire on Dreyfus and the castle itself. As the remaining henchmen, Fassbender and his daughter, and eventually Clouseau himself escape the dissolving castle, Dreyfus plays "Tiptoe Through the Tulips" on the castle's pipe organ while he himself disintegrates, until he and the castle vanish into thin air.

Returning to Paris, Clouseau is finally reunited with Olga. However, their tryst is interrupted first by Clouseau's apparent inability to remove his clothes, and then by Cato's latest surprise attack, which causes all three to be hurled into the river Seine when the reclining bed snaps back upright and crashes through the wall. Immediately thereafter, a cartoon image of Clouseau emerges from the water, which has been tinted pink, and begins swimming, unaware that a gigantic version of the Pink Panther character is waiting below him with a sharp-toothed, open mouth (a reference to the then-recent film Jaws, made further obvious by the thematic music). The film ends as the animated Clouseau chases the Pink Panther up the Seine as the credits roll.

Cast

Cast notes 
 Owing to Peter Sellers's heart condition, whenever possible he would have his stunt double Joe Dunne stand in for him. Because of the often physical nature of the comedy, this would occur quite frequently.
 Julie Andrews provided the singing voice for the female-impersonator "Ainsley Jarvis". The scene in the nightclub when Jarvis sings is in many ways similar to scenes in Edwards's later film Victor Victoria (1982), in which Andrews plays a woman pretending to be a man who is a female impersonator.
 Graham Stark, a longtime friend of Sellers, once again made an appearance in the series, albeit in a small role as the desk clerk of a small German hotel. Since his role as Hercule LaJoy in A Shot in the Dark, he has appeared in small roles in every Pink Panther sequel except Inspector Clouseau, in which Sellers did not play Clouseau.
 Scenes featuring Harvey Korman as Professor Auguste Balls and Marne Maitland as Deputy Commissioner Lasorde were deleted from the film, but were later seen in full in Trail of the Pink Panther in 1982. Graham Stark would assume the role of Professor Balls in the next film,  Revenge of the Pink Panther (1978).
 Omar Sharif appeared, uncredited, as the Egyptian assassin.
 Tom Jones sang the Oscar-nominated song "Come to Me".
 The role of Olga Bariosova was originally played by Maud Adams, who was replaced after filming a few scenes. Blake Edwards then intended to cast Nicola Pagett after seeing her in Upstairs, Downstairs but instead ended up casting Pagett's castmate Lesley-Anne Down in the role.
 Though the character of the President of the United States (portrayed by Dick Crockett) is unnamed in the film, it is obviously based on then current U.S. President Gerald Ford; Crockett bore more than a passing resemblance to the President and Ford's somewhat exaggerated reputation for clumsiness as depicted in the film was a national joke at the time. The President's unnamed somber Secretary of State (portrayed by Byron Kane) is obviously based on then current Secretary Henry Kissinger.  
 Blake Edwards made a cameo appearance in the background of the nightclub scene.

Production
The Pink Panther Strikes Again was rushed into production owing to the success of The Return of the Pink Panther. Blake Edwards had adapted one of two scripts that he and Frank Waldman had written for a proposed "Pink Panther" TV series as the basis for that film, and he adapted the other as the starting point for Strikes Again. As a result, it is the only Pink Panther sequel which has a storyline (Dreyfus in the insane asylum) that explicitly follows from the previous film. The plot has nothing to do with the famous "Pink Panther diamond" of previous films, but comes off more like a parody of James Bond movies.

The movie was in production from December 1975 to September 1976, with principal photography taking place between February and June 1976. The strained relationship between Sellers and Blake Edwards had further deteriorated by the time  production of Strikes Again was underway. Sellers was ailing both mentally and physically, and Edwards later commented on the actor's mental state during production of the film: "If you went to an asylum and you described the first inmate you saw, that's what Peter had become. He was certifiable."

The original cut of the film ran for around 124 minutes, but was trimmed down to 103 minutes for theatrical release. Edwards originally conceived Strikes Again as an epic, zany chase film, in a similar vein to his earlier The Great Race, but UA vetoed this long version and the film was edited down to a more conventional length.  Some of the excised footage was later used in Trail of the Pink Panther. Strikes Again was marketed with the tagline Why are the world's chief assassins after Inspector Clouseau? Why not? Everybody else is. Like its predecessor and subsequent sequel, the film was a box office success.

During the film's title sequence, there are references to television's Alfred Hitchcock Presents and  Batman, also the films King Kong, The Sound of Music (which starred Blake Edwards's wife, Julie Andrews), Dracula A.D. 1972, Singin' in the Rain, Steamboat Bill, Jr. and Sweet Charity, putting the Pink Panther character and the animated persona of Inspector Clouseau into recognizable events from said movies. There is also a reference to Jaws in the ending credits sequence. The scene in which Clouseau impersonates a dentist and the use of laughing gas and pulling the wrong tooth are clearly inspired by Bob Hope in The Paleface (1948).

Richard Williams (later of Roger Rabbit fame) supervised the animation of the opening and closing sequences for the second and final time; original animators DePatie-Freleng Enterprises would return on the next film, but with decidedly Williamesque influences.

Sellers was unhappy with the final cut of the film and publicly criticized Blake Edwards for misusing his talents. Their tense relationship is noted in the next Pink Panther movie's opening credits (Revenge of the Pink Panther) listing it as a "Sellers-Edwards" production.

French comic book writer René Goscinny of Asterix fame was reportedly trying to sue Blake Edwards for plagiarism at the time of his death in 1977 after noticing strong similarities to a script titled "Le Maître du Monde" (The Master of the World), which he had sent Peter Sellers in 1975.

Reception
On review aggregator Rotten Tomatoes, the film has an approval rating of 77% based on 22 reviews, with an average score of 7.30/10.

Roger Ebert of the Chicago Sun-Times gave the film two and a half stars out of four and wrote, "If I'm less than totally enthusiastic about The Pink Panther Strikes Again, maybe it was because I've been over this ground with Clouseau many times before," stating that a time would have to come "when inspiration gives way to habit, and I think the Pink Panther series is just about at that point. That's not to say this film isn't funny—it has moments as good as anything Sellers and Edwards have ever done—but that it's time for them to move on. They worked together once on the funniest movie either one has ever done, The Party. Now it's time to try something new again."

Vincent Canby of The New York Times wrote that the characters of Clouseau and Dreyfus "were made for each other," and further stated, "I'm not sure why Mr. Sellers and Mr. Lom are such a hilarious team, though it may be because each is a fine comic actor with a special talent for portraying the sort of all-consuming, epic self-absorption that makes slapstick farce initially acceptable—instead of alarming—and finally so funny." Canby also enjoyed Clouseau's French accent, and wrote, "Both Mr. Sellers and Mr. Edwards delight in old gags, and part of the joy of The Pink Panther Strikes Again is watching the way they spin out what is essentially a single routine".

The film earned theatrical rentals of $19.5 million in the United States and Canada from a gross of $33.8 million. Internationally, it earned rentals of $10.5 million for a worldwide total of $30 million. By March 1978, the film had grossed $75 million worldwide and was hoping to earn another $8 million by the end of the year.

Awards and nominations

American Film Institute Lists
 AFI's 100 Years...100 Laughs – Nominated
 AFI's 100 Years...100 Movie Quotes:
 "Does your dog bite?" – Nominated

Play adaptation
Around 1981, the film was adapted into a play by William Gleason - mostly for high school or community theatre productions. The storyline bares similarities to the film, although the locations are occasionally changed; women dressed as pink panthers also do scene changes. The play currently can be licensed through Dramatic Publishing.

References

External links

 
 
 
 

1970s heist films
1970s police comedy films
1976 films
American crime comedy films
American heist films
American sequel films
British crime comedy films
British heist films
British sequel films
Films directed by Blake Edwards
Films involved in plagiarism controversies
Films scored by Henry Mancini
Films set in 1976
Films set in England
Films set in France
Films set in West Germany
The Pink Panther films
United Artists films
Films with screenplays by Blake Edwards
1976 comedy films
American films with live action and animation
1970s English-language films
1970s American films
1970s British films